Navigation is the debut album by Irish Sonny Condell's band Radar and was released in May 2005

Track listing

Personnel 
 Sonny Condell – guitars, vocals
 Garvan Gallagher – bass guitar
 Eddie McGinn – drums
 Paul Barrett – keyboards, flugabone
 Mick de Hoog – violin, mandolin
 Eamon O'Reilly – flugelhorn on "Moth"
 Greg Boland – guitar on "Say You"

Production
 Paul Barrett – mixing, production
 Sonny Condell – sleeve design & photography
 Ruarí O'Flaherty – mastering

Release history

References 

2005 debut albums